Richard Allen Brown (November 13, 1932 – May 4, 2019) was an American attorney and judge from the State of New York. He was the Queens County District Attorney, having held office from 1991 until his death in 2019. Prior to becoming district attorney, Brown served as a judge of the New York Supreme Court, Appellate Division, Second Department. Brown was the longest serving district attorney in New York City. Brown died at the age of 86 in 2019.

References

1932 births
2019 deaths
Lawyers from New York City
Queens County (New York) District Attorneys
New York (state) Democrats
New York (state) state court judges
New York University School of Law alumni
Hobart and William Smith Colleges alumni
20th-century American judges
20th-century American lawyers